The Smolensk constituency (No.175) is a Russian legislative constituency in Smolensk Oblast. Until 2007 the constituency covered the entirety of Smolensk and western Smolensk Oblast, however, since 2016 Smolensk constituency includes only parts of Smolensk but also it was redistricted to northern Smolensk Oblast, taking more territory from eliminated Vyazma constituency.

Members elected

Election results

1993

|-
! colspan=2 style="background-color:#E9E9E9;text-align:left;vertical-align:top;" |Candidate
! style="background-color:#E9E9E9;text-align:left;vertical-align:top;" |Party
! style="background-color:#E9E9E9;text-align:right;" |Votes
! style="background-color:#E9E9E9;text-align:right;" |%
|-
|style="background-color:"|
|align=left|Anatoly Lukyanov
|align=left|Communist Party
|
|34.56%
|-
|style="background-color:"|
|align=left|Aleksandr Ignatenkov
|align=left|Agrarian Party
| -
|17.10%
|-
| colspan="5" style="background-color:#E9E9E9;"|
|- style="font-weight:bold"
| colspan="3" style="text-align:left;" | Total
| 
| 100%
|-
| colspan="5" style="background-color:#E9E9E9;"|
|- style="font-weight:bold"
| colspan="4" |Source:
|
|}

1995

|-
! colspan=2 style="background-color:#E9E9E9;text-align:left;vertical-align:top;" |Candidate
! style="background-color:#E9E9E9;text-align:left;vertical-align:top;" |Party
! style="background-color:#E9E9E9;text-align:right;" |Votes
! style="background-color:#E9E9E9;text-align:right;" |%
|-
|style="background-color:"|
|align=left|Anatoly Lukyanov (incumbent)
|align=left|Communist Party
|
|37.27%
|-
|style="background-color:"|
|align=left|Sergey Zhamoydo
|align=left|Liberal Democratic Party
|
|16.02%
|-
|style="background-color:#3A46CE"|
|align=left|Gennady Danilov
|align=left|Democratic Choice of Russia – United Democrats
|
|6.69%
|-
|style="background-color:"|
|align=left|Vasily Litvinov
|align=left|Independent
|
|5.32%
|-
|style="background-color:"|
|align=left|Boris Parfenov
|align=left|Yabloko
|
|4.32%
|-
|style="background-color:"|
|align=left|Aleksandr Plyaskin
|align=left|Independent
|
|4.20%
|-
|style="background-color:#2C299A"|
|align=left|Vitaly Shvedov
|align=left|Congress of Russian Communities
|
|3.29%
|-
|style="background-color:"|
|align=left|Aleksandr Zimin
|align=left|Independent
|
|2.90%
|-
|style="background-color:#F21A29"|
|align=left|Stanislav Dmitrachkov
|align=left|Trade Unions and Industrialists – Union of Labour
|
|1.75%
|-
|style="background-color:"|
|align=left|Aleksandr Belyakov
|align=left|Independent
|
|1.52%
|-
|style="background-color:"|
|align=left|Viktor Smirnov
|align=left|Independent
|
|1.38%
|-
|style="background-color:"|
|align=left|Sergey Krivko
|align=left|Independent
|
|1.24%
|-
|style="background-color:"|
|align=left|Aleksandr Popov
|align=left|Independent
|
|1.11%
|-
|style="background-color:#FF8201"|
|align=left|Vladimir Pekarev
|align=left|Christian-Democratic Union - Christians of Russia
|
|1.05%
|-
|style="background-color:#DD137B"|
|align=left|Aleksandr Golubev
|align=left|Social Democrats
|
|0.64%
|-
|style="background-color:#000000"|
|colspan=2 |against all
|
|9.46%
|-
| colspan="5" style="background-color:#E9E9E9;"|
|- style="font-weight:bold"
| colspan="3" style="text-align:left;" | Total
| 
| 100%
|-
| colspan="5" style="background-color:#E9E9E9;"|
|- style="font-weight:bold"
| colspan="4" |Source:
|
|}

1999

|-
! colspan=2 style="background-color:#E9E9E9;text-align:left;vertical-align:top;" |Candidate
! style="background-color:#E9E9E9;text-align:left;vertical-align:top;" |Party
! style="background-color:#E9E9E9;text-align:right;" |Votes
! style="background-color:#E9E9E9;text-align:right;" |%
|-
|style="background-color:"|
|align=left|Anatoly Lukyanov (incumbent)
|align=left|Communist Party
|
|32.00%
|-
|style="background-color:"|
|align=left|Yevgeny Kamanin
|align=left|Yabloko
|
|22.27%
|-
|style="background-color:"|
|align=left|Sergey Kolesnikov
|align=left|Independent
|
|18.95%
|-
|style="background-color:#C21022"|
|align=left|Viktor Grisin
|align=left|Party of Pensioners
|
|3.70%
|-
|style="background-color:"|
|align=left|Sergey Shepelev
|align=left|Liberal Democratic Party
|
|3.55%
|-
|style="background-color:#084284"|
|align=left|Vladimir Zaytsev
|align=left|Spiritual Heritage
|
|2.24%
|-
|style="background-color:"|
|align=left|Eduard Baltin
|align=left|Independent
|
|2.09%
|-
|style="background-color:#FCCA19"|
|align=left|Yury Grigoryev
|align=left|Congress of Russian Communities-Yury Boldyrev Movement
|
|1.79%
|-
|style="background-color:"|
|align=left|Yury Zheribor
|align=left|Kedr
|
|1.57%
|-
|style="background-color:#000000"|
|colspan=2 |against all
|
|10.36%
|-
| colspan="5" style="background-color:#E9E9E9;"|
|- style="font-weight:bold"
| colspan="3" style="text-align:left;" | Total
| 
| 100%
|-
| colspan="5" style="background-color:#E9E9E9;"|
|- style="font-weight:bold"
| colspan="4" |Source:
|
|}

2003

|-
! colspan=2 style="background-color:#E9E9E9;text-align:left;vertical-align:top;" |Candidate
! style="background-color:#E9E9E9;text-align:left;vertical-align:top;" |Party
! style="background-color:#E9E9E9;text-align:right;" |Votes
! style="background-color:#E9E9E9;text-align:right;" |%
|-
|style="background-color:"|
|align=left|Sergey Antufyev
|align=left|United Russia
|
|40.07%
|-
|style="background-color:"|
|align=left|Anatoly Lukyanov (incumbent)
|align=left|Communist Party
|
|15.06%
|-
|style="background-color:"|
|align=left|Sergey Maslakov
|align=left|Independent
|
|10.54%
|-
|style="background-color:"|
|align=left|Svetlana Korzhova
|align=left|Liberal Democratic Party
|
|6.99%
|-
|style="background-color:"|
|align=left|Aleksandr Ignatenkov
|align=left|Agrarian Party
|
|5.48%
|-
|style="background:"| 
|align=left|Boris Parfenov
|align=left|Yabloko
|
|2.32%
|-
|style="background:#1042A5"| 
|align=left|Igor Yukhimenko
|align=left|Union of Right Forces
|
|2.14%
|-
|style="background-color:#164C8C"|
|align=left|Mikhail Grigoryev
|align=left|United Russian Party Rus'
|
|0.86%
|-
|style="background-color:"|
|align=left|Sergey Fomchenkov
|align=left|Independent
|
|0.82%
|-
|style="background-color:#000000"|
|colspan=2 |against all
|
|13.46%
|-
| colspan="5" style="background-color:#E9E9E9;"|
|- style="font-weight:bold"
| colspan="3" style="text-align:left;" | Total
| 
| 100%
|-
| colspan="5" style="background-color:#E9E9E9;"|
|- style="font-weight:bold"
| colspan="4" |Source:
|
|}

2016

|-
! colspan=2 style="background-color:#E9E9E9;text-align:left;vertical-align:top;" |Candidate
! style="background-color:#E9E9E9;text-align:left;vertical-align:top;" |Party
! style="background-color:#E9E9E9;text-align:right;" |Votes
! style="background-color:#E9E9E9;text-align:right;" |%
|-
|style="background-color: " |
|align=left|Sergey Neverov
|align=left|United Russia
|
|56.64%
|-
|style="background-color:"|
|align=left|Aleksandr Gerasenkov
|align=left|Liberal Democratic Party
|
|13.36%
|-
|style="background-color:"|
|align=left|Aleksandr Stepchenkov
|align=left|Communist Party
|
|11.63%
|-
|style="background-color:"|
|align=left|Mikhail Atroshchenkov
|align=left|A Just Russia
|
|4.54%
|-
|style="background:"| 
|align=left|Oleg Aksenov
|align=left|Patriots of Russia
|
|4.03%
|-
|style="background:"| 
|align=left|Vladimir Stefantsov
|align=left|Communists of Russia
|
|2.06%
|-
|style="background-color:"|
|align=left|Oleg Petrikov
|align=left|Rodina
|
|1.49%
|-
|style="background-color:"|
|align=left|Yevgeny Dorosevich
|align=left|The Greens
|
|1.27%
|-
|style="background:"| 
|align=left|Yury Poskannoy
|align=left|Yabloko
|
|1.02%
|-
|style="background: "| 
|align=left|Roman Shisterov
|align=left|Party of Growth
|
|0.92%
|-
| colspan="5" style="background-color:#E9E9E9;"|
|- style="font-weight:bold"
| colspan="3" style="text-align:left;" | Total
| 
| 100%
|-
| colspan="5" style="background-color:#E9E9E9;"|
|- style="font-weight:bold"
| colspan="4" |Source:
|
|}

2021

|-
! colspan=2 style="background-color:#E9E9E9;text-align:left;vertical-align:top;" |Candidate
! style="background-color:#E9E9E9;text-align:left;vertical-align:top;" |Party
! style="background-color:#E9E9E9;text-align:right;" |Votes
! style="background-color:#E9E9E9;text-align:right;" |%
|-
|style="background-color: " |
|align=left|Sergey Neverov (incumbent)
|align=left|United Russia
|
|52.98%
|-
|style="background-color:"|
|align=left|Oleg Kopyl
|align=left|Communist Party
|
|13.81%
|-
|style="background-color:"|
|align=left|Andrey Ivanov
|align=left|A Just Russia — For Truth
|
|7.74%
|-
|style="background-color:"|
|align=left|Mikhail Kovalev
|align=left|Liberal Democratic Party
|
|6.01%
|-
|style="background:"| 
|align=left|Viktor Kozyrev
|align=left|Communists of Russia
|
|5.98%
|-
|style="background-color: "|
|align=left|Vladimir Shunin
|align=left|Party of Pensioners
|
|3.91%
|-
|style="background-color: " |
|align=left|Aleksandra Bichashvili
|align=left|New People
|
|3.87%
|-
|style="background: "| 
|align=left|Larisa Dolzhikova
|align=left|Yabloko
|
|2.13%
|-
| colspan="5" style="background-color:#E9E9E9;"|
|- style="font-weight:bold"
| colspan="3" style="text-align:left;" | Total
| 
| 100%
|-
| colspan="5" style="background-color:#E9E9E9;"|
|- style="font-weight:bold"
| colspan="4" |Source:
|
|}

Notes

References

Russian legislative constituencies
Politics of Smolensk Oblast